Scorcher: The Dirty Politics of Climate Change is a 2007 book by Clive Hamilton which contends that Australia rather than the United States is the major stumbling block to a more effective Kyoto Protocol. In the final chapter of the book Hamilton argues that "the Howard Government has been actively working to destroy the Kyoto Protocol".

Scorcher is an updated version of Hamilton's 2001 book, Running from the Storm. Other books by Clive Hamilton include Requiem for a Species, Silencing Dissent, Growth Fetish, Affluenza and The Freedom Paradox.

Quotes
"In the tight little world of greenhouse lobbying, the Prime Minister saw nothing improper in going to the country's biggest greenhouse polluters to ask them what the Government should do about greenhouse policy, without extending the same opportunity to other industries, not to mention environment groups and independent experts".

See also

 An Inconvenient Truth – a 2006 documentary featuring Al Gore
 Climate Code Red – a 2008 book from Australia on climate change
 Greenhouse Mafia
 List of Australian environmental books
 Politics of global warming
 Storms of My Grandchildren – a 2009 book by climate scientist James Hansen

References

Bibliography
 Hamilton, Clive (2007). Scorcher: The Dirty Politics of Climate Change, Black Inc Agenda, 266 pages.

2007 non-fiction books
2007 in the environment
Australian non-fiction books
Books by Clive Hamilton
Books about politics of Australia
Climate change books
Climate change in Australia
Environmental non-fiction books
Black Inc books